Hennediella heimii, also known as Heim's pottia, is a moss with 2.5 mm brown or yellow-green tufts.

Habitat and distribution
Hennediella heimii is found in saline environments such as coastal salt marshes, and in recent times on the verges of roads salted to prevent icing.

References

External links

Antarctic communities: species, structure, and survival

Pottiaceae
Flora of the United Kingdom
Flora of Antarctica
Plants described in 1837